Soria is a city in north-central Spain.

Soria may also refer to:

Soria (province), a province of central Spain
 9th Infantry Regiment “Soria”, a Spanish regiment named after the city.
Soria (grape), another name for the Italian wine grape Ansonica
Cross Internacional de Soria, annual cross country running competition in Spain
The Declaration of Soria Moria, 2005 Norwegian political accord
Soria Moria Castle, Norwegian fairy tale

People

Alberto Soria (born 1906), Peruvian footballer 
Alex Soria (1966–2004), Canadian rock and roll musician
Arturo Soria y Mata (1844–1920), Spanish urbanist
Carmelo Soria (1921–1976), Chilean diplomat
Carlos Soria (born 1949), Argentine politician
Carlos Soria Fontán (born 1939), Spanish mountaineer 
David Soria Yoshinari (born 1977), Peruvian footballer
Dorle Soria (1900–2002), publicist and record producer
Eleazar Soria (1948–2021), Peruvian footballer
Francisco Martínez Soria (1902–1982), Spanish actor 
Giovanni Battista Soria (1581–1651), Italian architect  
Javi Soria (born 1984), Spanish footballer
Javier Soria (born 1974), Peruvian footballer
Joakim Soria (born 1984), Mexican professional baseball player
Joaquín Soria Terrazas (1909–1990), Mexican President of CONCACAF
José Manuel Soria (born 1958), Spanish academic and politician
Karen Soria, Australian rabbi
Lorenzo Soria (1951–2020), Argentine-born Italian studio executive
Mauricio Soria (born 1966), Bolivian footballer
Miguel-Angel Soria, Mexican-American activist
Miguel Ángel Soria (born 1974), Spanish footballer
Mireille Soria (born 1970), producer at FilmWorks
Paulino Martínez Soria (born 1973), Spanish footballer
Ramón Soria (born 1989), Spanish footballer
Rodrigo Soria (born 1987), Argentine footballer
Rubén Soria (born 1935), Uruguayan footballer 
Sebastián Soria (born 1983), Uruguayan footballer
Sixto Soria (born 1954), Cuban boxer
Vladimir Soria (born 1964), Bolivian footballer
Xavier Soria (born 1972), Andorran footballer